Rodrigo Andrés Viligrón Barrientos (born 14 May 1976) is a Chilean former footballer.

Career
Born in Purranque, Viligrón began playing professional football with local side Deportes Puerto Montt in 1992. He led the club to a historic promotion to the Chilean Primera División in 1996. After playing professionally for 20 years, including spells with Provincial Osorno, CD O'Higgins, Cobresal, Colo-Colo, Cobreloa and Deportes Concepción, he retired from playing with his original club, Puerto Montt, in February 2014.

References

External links
 Viligrón at Football Lineups
 

1976 births
Living people
Chilean footballers
Chilean Primera División players
Primera B de Chile players
Puerto Montt footballers
Provincial Osorno footballers
O'Higgins F.C. footballers
Cobresal footballers
Cobreloa footballers
Colo-Colo footballers
Deportes Concepción (Chile) footballers
Association football midfielders
People from Osorno Province